Haris Vlavianos (born 1957), is a contemporary Greek poet.

Biography
Haris Vlavianos studied Economics and Philosophy at the University of Bristol. He also studied Politics and History at Trinity College in Oxford. His doctoral thesis, entitled "Greece 1941-1949: From Resistance to Civil War", was published by Macmillan in 1992. He is professor of History at the American College of Greece.

He has published ten collections of poetry, the most recent of them being Sonnets of Despair, in 2011. He has also published a collection of thoughts and aphorisms on poetry and poetics entitled, The Other Place (1994) and a book of essays entitled, Does Poetry Matter?: Thoughts on the Uselessness of an Art (2007), as well a book with haiku, entitled, The History of Western Philosophy in 100 Haikus: From the Presocratics to Derrida. He has translated into Greek, the works of well-known writers such as: Walt Whitman (Selected Poems, 1986), Ezra Pound (Hugh Selwyn Mauberley, 1987; Drafts and Fragments of Cantos CX-CXX, 1991), Michael Longley (Selected Poems, 1992), Wallace Stevens (Adagia, 1993), John Ashbery (Self-Portrait in a Convex Mirror, 1995), Carlo Goldoni (The Venetian Twins, 1996), William Blake (The Marriage of Heaven and Hell, 1997), Zbigniew Herbert (The Soul of Mr. Cogito and Other Poems, 2001), Fernando Pessoa (Herostrato: The Quest for Immortality, 2002; Marginalia, 2005), E. E. Cummings (33 x 3 x 33: Poems, Essays, Fragments, 2004), Wallace Stevens (Thirteen Ways of Looking at a Blackbird and Other Poems, 2007), Michael Longley (Homer's Octopus and Other Poems, 2008), T. S. Eliot (The Four Quartets, 2012).

He is the editor of the literary Greek journal Ποιητική (Poetics). His collection of poems Adieu, written in 1996, has been translated into English by David Connolly and published in the UK by Birmingham University Press (1998). A volume of his Selected Poems has been translated into German by Dadi Sideri Speck (Romiosini Press, 2011), into Dutch by Hero Hokwerda (Rotterdam Poetry International, 2000) and into Italian by Nicola Crocetti (Poesia, 2006).

A selection of his poetry has been translated into Catalan by Joaquim Gestí and published in Barcelona by the Institució de les Lletres Catalanes. Other volumes of Selected Poems have been translated into German by Torsten Israel (published by Hanser, with an introduction by Joachim Sartorius), into Dutch by Hero Hokwerda (published by Ovolos) and into English by Mina Karavanta (published by Dedalus Publications, with an introduction written by Michael Longley).

His poetry has also been translated into French, Spanish, Portuguese, Bulgarian, Albanian, and Swedish and has appeared in numerous European and American journals and anthologies.

Poetry
Ὑπνοβασίες ("Somnambulations") 1983. Greek 
Πωλητής θαυμάτων ("Pedlar of Miracles") 1985. Greek 
Τρόπος τοῦ λέγειν ("In a Manner of Speaking") 1986. Greek 

Η Νοσταλγία των Ουρανών ("The Nostalgia of the Skies") 1991. Greek 
Adieu. Nefeli, 1996.  Greek
 Adieu. Centre for Byzantine, Ottoman and Modern Greek Studies; University of Birmingham, 1998.  Greek and English.  

Ο Άγγελος της Ιστορίας ("The Angel of History") Nefeli, Athens 1999.  Greek
 Der Engel der Geschichte. Romiosini Verlag, Cologne 2001.  German translation
Μετά το Τέλος της Ομορφιάς ("After the End of Beauty") Nefeli, Athens, 2003.  Greek
Nach dem Ende der Schonheit. Edition Lyrik Kabinett bei Hanser, Munich 2007.  German translation
Affirmation: Selected Poems 1986-2006. Dedalus, Dublin 2007. 
 Διακοπές στην πραγματικότητα ("Vacation in Reality") Patakis, Athens, 2009. 
 Σονέτα της συμφοράς ("Sonnets of Despair"), Patakis, Athens, 2011. 
 Αυτοπροσωπογραφία του λευκού ("Self-Portrait of White"), Patakis, Athens, 2018

References

External links
Search for Haris Vlavianos at National Library of Greece (in Greek language)
Books by Haris Vlavianos at Greek Books in print (English)

1957 births
Living people
Modern Greek poets
20th-century Greek poets
Date of birth missing (living people)